Mervyn George Lakin (9 November 1888 – 19 June 1954) was an Australian politician.

He was born in Launceston. In May 1954 he was elected to the Tasmanian Legislative Council as the independent member for Mersey, but he died the following month, having served one of the shortest terms in the history of the Legislative Council.

References

1888 births
1954 deaths
Independent members of the Parliament of Tasmania
Members of the Tasmanian Legislative Council
20th-century Australian politicians